4 Soccer Simulators (later also released as Pro Soccer Simulator) is a collection of four soccer video games developed and released by Codemasters in 1988. It included four games; 11-a-Side Soccer, Indoor Soccer, Soccer Skills and Street Soccer. The games are all played using vertical scrolling. The collection was released on ZX Spectrum, Amstrad CPC, PC, Nintendo Entertainment System and Commodore 64. It was also advertised for Atari ST and Amiga but these versions were never released.

Reception
The Spanish magazine Microhobby valued the game with the following scores: Originality: 80%, Graphics: 70%, Motion: 70%, Sound: 80%, Difficulty: 70%, Addiction: 90%.

References

External links 
 4 Soccer Simulators at World of Spectrum
 Amstrad Soccer Games (A-Z) at Univision.com

1988 video games
Association football video games
Amstrad CPC games
Commodore 64 games
Codemasters games
DOS games
Video games scored by Allister Brimble
Video games scored by David Whittaker
ZX Spectrum games
Video games developed in the United Kingdom